Svetlana Sergeevna Druzhinina (born 16 December 1935 in Moscow) is a Soviet and Russian actress, film director, screenwriter, film producer. She is best known for directing the Gardes-Marines trilogy consisting of Gardes-Marines, ahead!, Viva Gardes-Marines! and Gardes-Marines-III.

Biography 

Svetlana Druzhinina was born on 16 December 1935 in Moscow. In 1946, Druzhinina entered the circus school, where she successfully worked with a group of circus acrobats for one year. A year later she moved to the ballet school at the Stanislavski and Nemirovich-Danchenko Moscow Academic Music Theatre. In 1955 she graduated from the ballet school of the Bolshoi Theatre, where she studied together with future ballet stars Māris Liepa and Natalya Kasatkina. Because of a serious injury Druzhinina couldn’t become a dancer.

In 1955 Druzhinina debuted as an actress in the movie Showcase for Supermarket. She played a shop assistant Sonja Bozhko. From 1955 to 1965 she was an actress at the central studio of Gorky Film Studio.

In 1960 Druzhinina graduated from the VGIK Faculty of Actor (actor's workshop of Olga Pyzhova and Boris Bibikov).

In 1969 Druzhinina graduated from the VGIK Faculty of Director (workshop of Igor Talankin), her thesis film was Zinka (screenwriter B. Mazhaev). In the same year she began her work as a director on Mosfilm.

Druzhinina was a hostess of the first Soviet humor TV shows and competitions called KVN on the Central Television (together with Mikhail Derzhavin).

Her debut as a director was in the movie called Fulfillment of Desires (1974) based on the novel by Veniamin Kaverin.

Druzhinina received her recognition and national love as a director in 1987 after the release of the TV film Gardes-Marines, ahead! This was her first experience as a director of a historical movie, and it was very successful. Later the history of the Russian Empire became the main theme of her work.

From 2000 to the present time Druzhinina is directing a TV series about the history of Russia in the 18th century called  Secrets of Palace coup d'etat. Russia, 18th century.

Family 

Mother - Anna Danilovna Myznikova, the Don Cossack, worked as a teacher in kindergarten.
Father - Sergei Ivanovich Druginyn, son of a priest, the driver (died during the Great Patriotic War).

Husband - Anatoly Mukasey (born 26 July 1938), Soviet and Russian filmmaker, People's Artist of the Russian Federation (2009). In 2013, the couple celebrated the 55th anniversary of marriage.

 The eldest son - Anatoly Mukasey, died in 1988.
grandson - Daniil (born 24 February 1987), engaged in computer editing movies.
 The youngest son - Michael Mukasey (born 3 January 1966), the Russian filmmaker and film producer.
grandson - Maxim, granddaughter - Elizabeth
 Third daughter-in-law - Yekaterina Gamova (born 17 October 1980), the Russian volleyball player of the national team, twice world champion, Merited Master of Sports of Russia. Michael and Yekaterina were married on 17 August 2012.

Filmography

Director, screenwriter and producer

Actor

Awards
Honored Artist of the RSFSR (1989)
People's Artist of Russia (2001)
Order of Honour (2006)
Order of Friendship (2012)

References

External links

1935 births
Living people
Actresses from Moscow
Soviet screenwriters
20th-century Russian screenwriters
Women screenwriters
Soviet film actresses
Russian film actresses
Soviet film directors
Soviet women film directors
Russian film directors
Russian women film directors
Writers from Moscow
20th-century Russian actresses
20th-century Russian women writers
Recipients of the Order of Honour (Russia)
Gerasimov Institute of Cinematography alumni
Academicians of the Russian Academy of Cinema Arts and Sciences "Nika"